Sportpark Het Schootsveld (Salland Cricket Club Ground) is a cricket ground in Deventer, the Netherlands.  The first recorded match held on the ground came in 1975 when Dansk XL Club played The Forty Club.  The ground later held four ICC Trophy matches in the 1990.  The ground held its first List A match in 1999 when the Netherlands played Cambridgeshire in the NatWest Trophy.  Two further List A matches have been played there, both in the 2011 Clydesdale Bank 40 when the Netherlands played Middlesex and Derbyshire.  The ground held its first first-class match in 2004 when the Netherlands hosted Ireland in the ICC Intercontinental Cup.  Two further first-class matches have been held there, one in the 2009–10 Intercontinental Cup when Scotland were the visitors, and another in the 2011–13 Intercontinental Cup which saw Kenya as the visitors.

At this venue, on 17 June 2018, a T20I between Scotland and Ireland was ended in a tie, though no Super Over was played. It was the tenth T20I match to end in a tie, and the first since the ICC playing conditions were implemented in September 2017, not to end with a Super Over. However, both teams knew that there would not be a Super Over in the event of a tie before the match. The International Cricket Council (ICC) confirmed that there should have been a Super Over, and apologised for the oversight.

The ground was used by Kon UD.

References

External links
Sportpark Het Schootsveld at ESPNcricinfo
Sportpark Het Schootsveld at CricketArchive

Cricket grounds in the Netherlands
Sports venues in Overijssel
Sport in Deventer
Buildings and structures in Deventer